Spring Rock Township is a township in Clinton County, Iowa, USA.  As of the 2000 census, its population was 1,142.

History
Spring Rock Township was organized in 1844. The township takes its name from a huge rock at found at a spring in Scott County.

Geography
According to the USGS, it contains four cemeteries: Homigrahusen, Pine Hill, Rose Hill and Saint Pauls.

The streams of Calamus Creek, Lizard Creek, Rock Creek and Yankee Run run through this township.

Notes

References
 USGS Geographic Names Information System (GNIS)

External links
 US-Counties.com
 City-Data.com

Townships in Clinton County, Iowa
Townships in Iowa
1844 establishments in Iowa Territory